The National Academy of Sciences of Argentina was created in 1869 by President D. F. Sarmiento in the City of Cordoba, Argentina, as a scientific corporation supported by the
Federal Government. It was the first Academy to be supported by the Federal Government. It was finally consolidated legally in 1878 by presidential decree. Since its inception, the Academy has advocated for the development and outreach of exact and natural sciences, the exploration of the Argentine territory and has served as advisor to the National Government, provincial governments and other scientific institutions. The academy also awards prizes, publishes a journal and keeps a library and organizes conferences and other events. The building of the Academy was inaugurated in 1897 and was declared a National Historical Monument in 1994.

Many important scientists are or have been members of the Academy including: Charles Darwin, Benjamin Gould, Henri Milne-Edwards and, more recently, Argentine Nobel laureates Bernardo Houssay and Luis Leloir.

External links
Academy's home page.

Argentina
1869 establishments in Argentina
Scientific organizations established in 1869
Scientific organisations based in Argentina